Andrew Howard Dawson Perry (born 2 July 1976 in Portsmouth, Hampshire) is a former English cricketer. Perry was a right-handed batsman who bowled right-arm off break.

Perry made his List A debut for the Hampshire Cricket Board in the 1999 NatWest Trophy against the Suffolk. Perry played in six List A matches for the Hampshire Cricket Board, the last of which came in the 2nd round of 2003 Cheltenham and Gloucester Trophy which was played in 2002 against Staffordshire.

Perry played six Second Eleven Championship matches in 2000 for the Hampshire Second XI.

External links
Andrew Perry at Cricinfo
Andrew Perry at CricketArchive

1976 births
Living people
Cricketers from Portsmouth
English cricketers
Hampshire Cricket Board cricketers